Ogo is an arrondissement of Matam in Matam Region in Senegal.

References 

Arrondissements of Senegal